Petra Jaya is a suburb of Kuching, Sarawak, Malaysia. This suburb was named after sixth Yang di-Pertuan Agong, Tuanku Yahya Petra of Kelantan (1975-1979).

History
The suburb was founded in the 1970s by Sarawak chief minister at that time named Abdul Rahman Ya'kub. He saw a vision to develop the jungles and old rubber plantations here as the new satellite township next to Kuching. He began the project by constructing a bridge between Petra Jaya and Kuching, known as Datuk Patinggi Haji Abdul Rahman Bridge, across the Sarawak River in May 1975. In 1976, Wisma Bapa Malaysia was built. He also started on low-cost housing project which is known as Kampung Malaysia Jaya (Malaysia Jaya village) today.

The area where Petra Jaya was sited was formerly known as Matang. Most of the land in the area then was undeveloped. Kampungs or villages along and near the riverbanks of the Sarawak river were the only residential areas. The area was only accessible by the Satok suspension bridge, ferry or sampan. Since 1975, the completion of the Datuk Patinggi Tun Abdul Rahman Yaakub bridge, known as the Satok Bridge, together with construction of new road networks has made the area more accessible to development. Development in the area was further accelerated when it was designated as the Administrative Centre for the Sarawak Government, whereby many government offices and bodies relocated their headquarters and offices to Petra Jaya.

Administration
Petra Jaya is under the administrative jurisdiction of Dewan Bandaraya Kuching Utara (DBKU). The Kuching North City Hall (DBKU) headquarters is located here. In addition to that, the Administrative Centre of the Sarawak Government is located here.

Geography and demographics
Petra Jaya covers a large portion of Kuching City North area across the Sarawak river, north of Kuching City Centre and stretches from the Northern bank of the Sarawak River, right after the bridge at Satok up till the Santubong Bridge further north which connects Petra Jaya to the Santubong Peninsula. The land in the area are generally flat with several hilly areas near Semariang. Most lands in this area are classified as Native Area Land and as such, a significant portion of the population in Petra Jaya are Bumiputras.

Development
Relatively Petra Jaya is the most developed area in Kuching City North barring areas under DBKU which are south of the Sarawak River. It is fairly densely developed in the south or near the river. Most of the development in Petra Jaya are residential in nature. Commercial developments are few and far in between with scattered blocks of shophouses. It is notable that industries except for light small scale ones, are almost absent in Petra Jaya.

Transportation
Petra Jaya is accessible from Kuching City South via Datuk Patinggi Tun Abdul Rahman Yaakub Bridge from Satok and the newly completed Tun Salahuddin Bridge from Pending. Alternative access is via the Bako Causeway or Jalan Matang-Batu Kawa. Petra Jaya typical low density characteristic of a suburb has caused residents to be heavily reliant on cars because public transportation is quite poor in this part of Kuching.

List of attractions
The Astana
Fort Margherita
Sarawak State Museum
Wisma Bapa Malaysia - Old state assembly building is located here
New Sarawak State Legislative Assembly Building - the new state assembly building
Petra Jaya State Mosque
Sarawak State Library
Kuching North City Hall (DBKU) headquarters, Bukit Siol
Kuching Cat Museum
Hornbill's statue
Stadium Sarawak
Stadium Perpaduan
Stadium Negeri
DBKU Orchid Garden
Kubah Ria (Wet Market near Satok Bridge)
Pandelela Rinong Aquatic Centre

References

Planned cities in Malaysia
Kuching